Faydherbe or Fayd'herbe is a surname. Notable people with the surname include:

 Antoon Faydherbe (died 1653), Flemish sculptor
 Hendrik Faydherbe (1574–1629), Flemish sculptor and gilder, and poet
 Lucas Faydherbe (1617–1697), Flemish sculptor and architect 
 Maria Faydherbe (1587–1643), Flemish sculptor